To Heart is a 1999 Japanese anime television series based on the visual novel To Heart by the Japanese software company Leaf. The episodes, produced by the animation studio Oriental Light and Magic, are directed by Naohito Takahashi and aired in Japan between April 1 and June 24, 1999 compiling thirteen episodes. Six short bonus broadcasts were produced and aired after selected episodes. They lasted around five minutes and followed the general style of the main anime, although the characters are drawn super deformed. The overall story centers on Akari Kamigishi's blossoming relationship with the protagonist Hiroyuki. Three pieces of theme music were used for the episode; one opening theme and two ending themes. The opening theme is "Feeling Heart" by Masami Nakatsukasa; the first ending theme is "Yell" by Ayako Kawasumi, and the second ending theme is "Access" by Spy. Different ending themes were used depending on the location of the broadcast. The DVD and VHS releases used "Yell" as the ending theme. A set of six DVDs, videotapes and laserdiscs were sold in Japan for the To Heart anime.

To Heart was licensed for North American release by The Right Stuf International at Anime Expo 2004 on July 3, 2004 at their panel. Volume one was scheduled for late 2005, but the master copies Right Stuf received from Japan were in bad shape, delaying the release. Because To Heart was animated in the process of cel animation, it was captured onto film prior to conversion to video, and the video master showed dirt, glue marks, and other artifacts as a result of the process. Normally the original film would be restored to create a new master, but in this case the original film had been destroyed. As a result, the only choice was to digitally restore and remaster the video. All thirteen episodes and the six bonus extra was released on four DVD volumes between March 27 and August 28, 2007.

A sequel anime series entitled To Heart: Remember My Memories is set a year after the conclusion of the first anime and completes the anime's storyline (deviating from the visual novel). The future of Akari, Hiroyuki, and Multi are also shown. The Himeyuri twins from To Heart 2 make their debut appearances in To Heart: Remember My Memories as speaking cameos. The anime, which was produced by AIC and Oriental Light and Magic, and directed by Keitaro Motonaga, aired in Japan between October 2 and December 25, 2004 compiling thirteen episodes. The episodes were released on seven DVD compilation volumes in Japan. Seven short omake episodes titled Heart Fighters were released with the consumer DVD versions of To Heart: Remember My Memories; they are not available on rental DVDs. Unlike the bonus shorts of the first season, the characters are not drawn super deformed and there is an overall arching mini-story. The humor comes from its parodies of popular Japanese culture.

An anime television series for To Heart 2 was produced by Oriental Light and Magic and directed by Norihiko Sudō. Conisch and Kei Haneoka provided the soundtrack for the series. The episodes aired between October 3, 2005 and January 2, 2006 consisting of thirteen episodes. A three-episode original video animation series was produced by Aquaplus and Chaos Project with a new, original story. It was released on three DVDs between February 28 and September 28, 2007. A second OVA series titled To Heart 2: Another Days, was released on two DVDs, each containing an episode, between March 26 and August 8, 2008.

To Heart

Bonus shorts

To Heart: Remember My Memories

To Heart 2 (anime television series)

To Heart 2 (OVA)

To Heart 2 ad

To Heart 2 adplus

To Heart 2 adnext

To Heart 2: Dungeon Travelers

References

External links
To Heart: Remember My Memories official website 
To Heart at The Right Stuf International
To Heart 2 TV anime official website 
To Heart 2 OVA website 

To Heart
Episodes